Vicente Romero Romero (born 8 February 1987) is a Spanish former footballer who played as a right midfielder.

Football career
Romero was born in Valencia. A product of local Valencia CF's youth academy, he only appeared once for its first team, when he played 15 minutes in the club's 0–1 away loss against A.S. Roma for the season's UEFA Champions League on 5 December 2006 after coming on as a  substitute for Jorge López.

The vast majority of Romero's senior career was spent in the Valencian Community, in the lower leagues – Segunda División B or lower.

References

External links

1987 births
Living people
Footballers from Valencia (city)
Spanish footballers
Association football midfielders
Segunda División B players
Tercera División players
Valencia CF Mestalla footballers
Valencia CF players
Ontinyent CF players
UD Alzira footballers